Marc Duvillard (born 22 November 1952) is a retired Swiss football striker and later manager.

References

External links
 Marc Duvillard Interview

1951 births
Living people
Swiss men's footballers
CS Chênois players
FC Lausanne-Sport players
Neuchâtel Xamax FCS players
FC La Chaux-de-Fonds players
Association football forwards
Swiss football managers
FC La Chaux-de-Fonds managers
FC Lugano managers
FC Lausanne-Sport managers